The 1937 Washington Senators won 73 games, lost 80, and finished in sixth place in the American League. They were managed by Bucky Harris and played home games at Griffith Stadium.

Offseason 
 January 29, 1937: Red Kress, Carl Reynolds and cash were traded by the Senators to the Minneapolis Millers for Jimmy Wasdell.

Regular season

Season standings

Record vs. opponents

Notable transactions 
 April 4, 1937: Al Simmons was purchased by the Senators from the Detroit Tigers for $15,000.
 May 2, 1937: Shanty Hogan was traded by the Senators to Indianapolis Indians for Johnny Riddle. The trade was voided on May 20, with the players returned to their original teams.
 June 21, 1937: Shanty Hogan was released by the Senators.

Roster

Player stats

Batting

Starters by position 
Note: Pos = Position; G = Games played; AB = At bats; H = Hits; Avg. = Batting average; HR = Home runs; RBI = Runs batted in

Other batters 
Note: G = Games played; AB = At bats; H = Hits; Avg. = Batting average; HR = Home runs; RBI = Runs batted in

Pitching

Starting pitchers 
Note: G = Games pitched; IP = Innings pitched; W = Wins; L = Losses; ERA = Earned run average; SO = Strikeouts

Other pitchers 
Note: G = Games pitched; IP = Innings pitched; W = Wins; L = Losses; ERA = Earned run average; SO = Strikeouts

Relief pitchers 
Note: G = Games pitched; W = Wins; L = Losses; SV = Saves; ERA = Earned run average; SO = Strikeouts

Farm system 

LEAGUE CHAMPIONS: Salisbury

References

External links
1937 Washington Senators at Baseball-Reference
1937 Washington Senators team page at www.baseball-almanac.com

Minnesota Twins seasons
Washington Senators season
Washing